National Secondary Route 213, or just Route 213 (or ) is a National Road Route of Costa Rica, located in the San José province.

Description
In San José province the route covers San José canton (Hospital, Catedral, San Sebastián districts), Desamparados canton (Desamparados district).

References

Highways in Costa Rica